Omar Al Hamwi (born 7 April 1993, in Hama) is a Syrian footballer who currently plays for Al-Sheikh Hussein FC in Jordan.

References

External links
 alwehda.gov.sy 

1993 births
Living people
Syrian footballers
Association football defenders
Expatriate footballers in Jordan
Sportspeople from Homs
Syrian expatriate footballers
Syrian expatriate sportspeople in Jordan
Syrian Premier League players